Orthographic transcription is a transcription method that employs the standard spelling system of each target language.

Examples of orthographic transcription are "Pushkin" and "Pouchkine", respectively the English and French orthographic transcriptions of the surname "Пу́шкин" in the name Алекса́ндр Пу́шкин (Alexander Pushkin). Thus, each target language (English and French) transcribes the surname according to its own orthography.

Contrast with phonetic transcription, phonemic orthography, transliteration, and translation.

Distinction from transliteration

Transcription as a mapping from sound to script must be distinguished from transliteration, which creates a mapping from one script to another that is designed to match the original script as directly as possible. Standard transcription schemes for linguistic purposes include the International Phonetic Alphabet (IPA), and its ASCII equivalent, SAMPA. Transcription is often confused with transliteration, perhaps due to a common journalistic practice of mixing elements of both in rendering foreign names. The resulting practical transcription is a hybrid that is called both "transcription" and "transliteration" by the general public.

While transliteration only occurs when different scripts are concerned, transcription may very well be used for different languages using the same script. For example, the name of Bulgarian city Търговище is rendered as Тырговиште in Russian, because the letters ъ and щ in Russian have a different function than in Bulgarian. Likewise, some languages using the Latin script use orthographic transcription for all foreign names: George Walker Bush is written Džordžs Volkers Bušs in Latvian (the ending -s marks the nominative case of masculine names, see Latvian declension) and Corc Volker Buş in Azerbaijani.

The table below shows examples of phonetic transcription of the name of the former Russian president known in English as Boris Yeltsin, followed by accepted hybrid forms in various languages. English speakers will pronounce "Boris" differently from the original Russian, so it is a transliteration rather than a transcription in the strict sense.

The same words are likely to be transcribed differently under different systems. For example, the Mandarin Chinese name for the capital of the People's Republic of China is Beijing using the commonly used contemporary system Hànyǔ Pīnyīn, but in the historically significant Wade–Giles system, it is written Pei-Ching.

Practical transcription can be done into a non-alphabetic language too. For example, in a Hong Kong newspaper, George Bush's name is transliterated into two Chinese characters that sound like "Bou-sū" (布殊) by using the characters that mean  "cloth" and "special". Similarly, many words from English and other Western European languages are borrowed in Japanese and are transcribed using Katakana, one of the Japanese syllabaries.

Subsequent divergence
After transcribing a word from one language to the script of another language:
 one or both languages may develop further. The original correspondence between the sounds of the two languages may change, and so the pronunciation of the transcribed word develops in a different direction from the original pronunciation.
 the transcribed word may be adopted as a loanword in another language with the same script. This often leads to a pronunciation and spelling which are different from a direct transcription.

This is especially evident for Greek loanwords and proper names. Greek words were historically first transcribed to Latin (according to their old pronunciations), and then loaned into other languages, and finally the loanword has developed according to the rules of the target language. For example, Aristotle is the currently used English form of the name of the philosopher whose name in Greek is spelled  ̓Aριστoτέλης (Aristotélēs), which was transcribed to Latin Aristoteles, from where it was loaned into other languages and followed their linguistic development. (In "classical" Greek of Aristotle's time, lower-case letters were not used, and the name was spelled ΑΡΙΣΤΟΤΕΛΗΣ.)

Pliocene, a much more recent word, comes from the Greek words πλείων (pleiôn, "more") and καινóς (kainós, "new"), which were first transcribed (Latinised) to plion and caenus and then loaned into other languages.
( became  because there was no  in Latin.)

When this process continues over several languages, it may fail miserably to convey the original pronunciation. One ancient example is the Sanskrit word dhyāna ("contemplation", "meditation") which was transcribed into the Chinese word ch'anna through Buddhist scriptures; next shortened into ch'an. Ch'an (禪), pronounced zen in Japanese, used as the name of the Buddhist sect of "Chan" (Zen Buddhism), was transcribed from Japanese (ゼン zen) to zen in English. Dhyāna to zen is quite a change.

Another issue is any subsequent change in "preferred" transcription. For instance, the word describing a philosophy or religion in China was popularized in English as Tao and given the termination -ism to produce an English word Taoism. That transcription reflects the Wade–Giles system. More recent Pinyin transliterations produce Dao and Daoism.
(See also Daoism–Taoism romanization issue.)

Transcription and transliteration example: "Boris Yeltsin"

See also
 Interlinear gloss
 Phonetic spelling
 Phonetic transcription
 Romanization
 Speech recognition
 Subtitle (captioning)
 Transliteration

References

Transcription (linguistics)
Orthography